R Centauri (R Cen) is a Mira variable star in the constellation Centaurus.

The distance to R Centauri as indicated by its Gaia Data Release 3 parallax is about 2,900 light years, but that is considered to be potentially unreliable.  The Gaia Data Release 2 parallax was negative and relatively meaningless.  The older Hipparcos parallax suggested a distance of about 1,300 light years, but with a wide margin of error.  Estimates based on an assumed brightness for the star, adjusted for extinction, give distances as low as 750 light years.

Its luminosity is even more uncertain, depending on assumptions about the distance.

R Centauri is a Mira variable and its brightness varies from magnitude +5.2 to +11.5 with a period of about 500 days.  It used to have an unusual double-peaked light curve, but by 2001 this had reverted to an almost normal single-peaked curve.  Prior to 1950 the period was about 550 days, but since then has decreased to about 500 days.  A 2016 analysis of ASAS data derived a period of 498.84 days.

It is thought that the unusual behaviour of R Centauri is caused by a flash in the helium shell around its core, which occurs periodically in asymptotic giant branch (AGB) stars as the mass of the helium shell increases with helium from the outer hydrogen shell.  It is also an H2O maser source.

References 

Centaurus (constellation)
Mira variables
M-type bright giants
Centauri, R
124601
5326
069754
Durchmusterung objects
Emission-line stars